Vaavu may have more than one meaning:

Vaavu Atoll, an administrative division of the Maldives.
Vaavu, the ninth consonant of the Thaana abugida used in Dhivehi.